The blocking of Meta Platforms in Russia is the process of blocking access and subsequent banning of Meta Platforms' social networks in Russia due to allowing Facebook and Instagram users to wish the death of Russian President Vladimir Putin and Belarusian President Alexander Lukashenko, as well as to call for violence against Russian servicemen participating in Russia's invasion of Ukraine.

The essence of the conflict 
On March 11, 2022, Andy Stone, a representative of Meta company, which owns the social networks Facebook and Instagram, stated on his Twitter account that the company temporarily allowed the death wish of the Presidents of Russia and Belarus Vladimir Putin and Aleksandr Lukashenko, as well as calls for violence against the Russian military taking part in Russia's invasion of Ukraine.

Chronology of events 
On March 11, 2022, the British edition of Reuters, citing its sources, reported that Meta would temporarily allow the leaders of Russia and Belarus to wish death on their social networks, as well as to call for violence against the Russian military, which is directly related to Russia's invasion of Ukraine. Some time after the appearance of these data, Roskomnadzor demanded that the company confirm or deny the information.

On the same day, the official representative of Meta Andy Stone on his Twitter account confirmed the data that appeared in the media. Now it was possible to wish death only to the Russian and Belarusian leaders and in the context of Russia's invasion of Ukraine. This has become allowed in a number of countries (Russia, Belarus, Ukraine, Armenia, Azerbaijan, Estonia, Georgia, Hungary, Latvia, Lithuania, Poland, Romania and Slovakia).

After a short time, the press service of Roskomnadzor announced the beginning of blocking access to Meta's social networks at the request of the Prosecutor General's Office of Russia. After that, Roskomnadzor clarified that full access to Instagram will be blocked at midnight, March 14, since, according to representatives, active users need time to transfer their materials to other social networks.

On March 14, 2022, Meta Vice President Nick Clegg announced the return of the ban on death wishes to presidents and stated that the company opposes Russophobia. However, despite the change in position in the Meta's management, in the Russian regions, and then in Moscow, at midnight local time, access to Instagram disappeared. The social network was blocked anyway. Also on March 14, Roskomnadzor added Instagram to the register of banned sites.

Prohibition of activities in the country 
On March 21, 2022, the Tverskoy District Court of Moscow upheld the claim of the Prosecutor General's Office of Russia, supported by Roskomnadzor and the FSB, and recognized Meta as an extremist organization and banned its activities in Russia. Judge Olga Solopova said that this decision does not apply to WhatsApp, since it is a messenger, not a social network.

At the court hearing, the prosecutor stated that "Meta's activities in Russia should be stopped, because under the guise of commercial activity, the company spreads calls for violence against citizens, violates their rights and poses a threat to the constitutional order." He also stated that "Meta has actually legalized hate speech on its platform and it has a special position that stands above the law and acceptable norms. Meta creates an alternative reality for users, where there is aggression towards Russians, and the company, in fact, becomes a political tool in the interests of its country of origin."

Despite the recognition of the company as extremist, people who continue to use these social networks will not bear any responsibility.

Opinion of officials 
The first to respond to reports of a change in the Meta company's policy was the Governor of the Ulyanovsk region, Alexey Russkih. He called on Russians to ignore "unfriendly" social networks and said that "In fact the masks have been dropped. The propaganda rhetoric of the West has reached its apogee. This is outright hatred of all Russians, which defies any understanding and justification. In this regard, as the Governor of the Russian region, as a citizen of Russia, I cannot afford to remain a user of hostile social networks. And I urge all of you to follow my example."

Following the confirmation of news about the permission to wish the death of the heads of the two states and the Russian military, the governors of the Russian regions massively began to leave Meta's social networks. On March 11, respective Instagram accounts were abandoned by various Russian governors, such as the Governor of the Murmansk Region Andrey Chibis, the Governor of the Novosibirsk Region Andrey Travnikov, the Governor of the Ryazan Region Nikolay Lyubimov, the Governor of the Kursk Region Roman Starovoit and the Mayor of Kursk Igor Kutsak.

See also
 Blocking of Telegram in Russia
 Blocking of Wikipedia in Russia

References

March 2022 events in Russia
Internet censorship in Russia
Meta Platforms